Julia (minor planet designation: 89 Julia) is a large main-belt asteroid that was discovered by French astronomer Édouard Stephan on August 6, 1866. This was first of his two asteroid discoveries; the other was 91 Aegina. 89 Julia is believed to be named after Saint Julia of Corsica. A stellar occultation by Julia was observed on December 20, 1985.

The spectrum of 89 Julia shows the signature of silicate rich minerals with possible indications of an abundant calcic clinopyroxene component. It is classified as an S-type asteroid.

Nonza crater and Julian family
89 Julia is the parent body of the eponymous Julia family of asteroids. The crater was named Nonza by the discoverers, referring to the commune on the island of Corsica where Saint Julia was born. It is hypothesized an impact 30 to 120 million years ago by another body approximately 8 kilometers in diameter may have created the collisional family.

References

External links 
 
 

000089
Discoveries by Édouard Stephan
Named minor planets
000089
000089
18660806